The 1978 Bowling Green Falcons football team represented Bowling Green State University in the 1978 NCAA Division I-A football season.
The Falcons finished the season with a 4–7 record.

Schedule

References

Bowling Green
Bowling Green Falcons football seasons
Bowling Green Falcons football